Iyam Friday (born 1 December 1989 in Kaduna) is a Nigerian footballer, who currently plays for FC Viikingit.

References

1989 births
Living people
Nigerian footballers
Nigerian expatriate footballers
Expatriate footballers in Finland
AC Oulu players
Veikkausliiga players
Kaduna United F.C. players
Nigerian expatriate sportspeople in Finland
Atlantis FC players
Salon Palloilijat players
Association football midfielders
Sportspeople from Kaduna